The 1933 All-Ireland Senior Hurling Championship was the 47th staging of the All-Ireland Senior Hurling Championship, the Gaelic Athletic Association's premier inter-county hurling tournament. The draw for the Munster fixtures took place on 26 February 1933, while the draw for the Leinster fixtures took place on 5 March 1933. The championship began on 23 April 1933 and ended on 3 September 1933.

Kilkenny entered the championship as the defending champions.

On 3 September 1933, Kilkenny won the championship following a 1-7 to 0-6 defeat of Limerick in the All-Ireland final. This was their second All-Ireland title in succession and their 10th All-Ireland title overall.

Limerick's Mick Mackey was the championship's top scorer with 4-8.

Teams

A total of 13 teams contested the championship, the same number of participants from the previous championship. There were no new entrants.

Team summaries

Results

Leinster Senior Hurling Championship

Quarter-finals

Semi-finals

Final

Munster Senior Hurling Championship

Quarter-finals

Semi-finals

Final

All-Ireland Senior Hurling Championship

Semi-final

Final

Championship statistics

Miscellaneous

 The Munster final between Limerick and Waterford ends in disarray as a fight breaks out amongst the players.  Many spectators rush the field and also join in the melee.  Officials fail to clear the field to restart the match so Limerick are awarded the title as they were winning by a considerable amount at the time.

Sources

 Corry, Eoghan, The GAA Book of Lists (Hodder Headline Ireland, 2005).
 Donegan, Des, The Complete Handbook of Gaelic Games (DBA Publications Limited, 2005).

References

1933
All-Ireland Senior Hurling Championship